Wallace Howe (March 4, 1878 in Fitchburg, Massachusetts – November 23, 1957 in Los Angeles, California), born Orlando Wallace Howe, was an American film actor. He appeared in 104 films between 1918 and 1936, including many films with Harold Lloyd and Stan Laurel, and in short films with the original Our Gang.

Filmography

The Milky Way (1936)
Movie Crazy (1932)
Horse Shy (1928) short film
Speedy (1928)
Behind the Counter (1928) short film
Good Cheer (1926) short film
Whispering Lions (1925) short film
The Freshman (1925)
Girl Shy (1924)
Derby Day (1923) short film
The Whole Truth (1923) short film
It's a Gift (1923) short film
Why Worry? (1923)
The Uncovered Wagon (1923) short film
Dogs of War (1923) short film
Back Stage (1923) short film
Sold at Auction (1923) short film
Giants vs. Yanks (1923) short film
Boys to Board (1923) short film
The Smile Wins (1923) short film
Safety Last! (1923)
A Pleasant Journey (1923) short film
Before the Public (1923) short film
Jailed and Bailed (1923) short film
The Champeen (1923) short film
Dig Up (1923) short film
Blaze Away (1922) short film
Dr. Jack (1922)
Young Sherlocks (1922) short film
Our Gang (1922) short film
Out on Bail (1922) short film
One Terrible Day (1922) short film
The Landlubber (1922) short film
Rough on Romeo (1922) short film
Take Next Car (1922) short film
The Bride-to-Be (1922) short film
The Dumb-Bell (1922) short film
The Late Lamented (1922) short film
Friday the Thirteenth (1922) short film
Good Morning Judge (1922) short film
Punch the Clock (1922) short film
Grandma's Boy (1922)
Stand Pat (1922) short film
Pardon Me (1922) short film
A Sailor-Made Man (1921)
On Location (1921) short film
Fifteen Minutes (1921) short film
Late Hours (1921) short film
Never Weaken (1921) short film
Sweet By and By (1921) short film
The Chink (1921) short film
I Do (1921) short film
On Their Way (1921) short film
Stop Kidding (1921) short film
Among Those Present (1921) short film
Hurry West (1921) short film
Hobgoblins (1921) short film
Now or Never (1921) short film
Running Wild (1921) short film
Paint and Powder (1921) short film
Prince Pistachio (1921) short film
Oh, Promise Me (1921) short film
Number, Please? (1920) short film
The Sleepyhead (1920) short film
Queens Up! (1920) short film
June Madness (1920) short film
Mamma's Boy (1920) short film
Get Out and Get Under (1920) short film
Run 'Em Ragged (1920) short film
High and Dizzy (1920) short film
An Eastern Westerner (1920) short film
Cracked Wedding Bells (1920) short film
Haunted Spooks (1920) short film
His Royal Slyness (1920) short film
The Dippy Dentist (1920) short film
From Hand to Mouth (1919) short film
Don't Shove (1919) short film (as W. Howe)
Heap Big Chief (1919) short film
Chop Suey & Co. (1919) short film
Count Your Change (1919) short film
A Jazzed Honeymoon (1919) short film
Never Touched Me (1919) short film
Spring Fever (1919) short film
Off the Trolley (1919) short film
The Marathon (1919) short film
Si, Senor (1919) short film
Ring Up the Curtain (1919) short film
Crack Your Heels (1919) short film
Young Mr. Jazz (1919) short film 
Just Dropped In (1919) short film
A Sammy In Siberia (1919) short film
Next Aisle Over (1919) short film 
Hoot Mon! (1919) short film
On the Fire (1919) short film
Ask Father (1919) short film
Going! Going! Gone! (1919) short film (as W. Howe)
Take a Chance (1918) short film
Just Rambling Along (1918) short film
Nothing But Trouble (1918) short film
No Place Like Jail (1918) short film
Kicking the Germ Out of Germany (1918) short film
Somewhere in Turkey (1918) short film
The City Slicker (1918) short film
Two-Gun Gussie (1918) short film

External links

1957 deaths
1878 births
American male film actors
American male silent film actors
20th-century American male actors
People from Fitchburg, Massachusetts
Male actors from Massachusetts
Our Gang